Euchrysops decaryi is a butterfly in the family Lycaenidae. It is found on Madagascar.

References

Butterflies described in 1947
Euchrysops